Yang Liujing (born 22 August 1998) is a Chinese racewalker.

She won the bronze medal at the 2019 World Athletics Championships in Doha.

References

External links

1998 births
Living people
Chinese female racewalkers
World Athletics Championships athletes for China
World Athletics Championships medalists